Charles William (9 November 1735 – 17 May 1803) was Prince of Nassau-Usingen from 1775 until his death.  From 1797 until his death, he was also titular Prince of Nassau-Saarbrücken, however, Nassau-Saarbrücken was occupied by France during that period.

He was born in Usingen, the eldest son of Prince Charles of Nassau-Usingen and his wife, Christina Wilhelmina, the daughter of Duke John William III of Saxe-Eisenach.

In 1770, Charles William became Lieutenant-General in the Dutch army.  In 1789, he was promoted to general and in 1790 to colonel of the Walloon regiment and captain of the grenadiers.

In 1775, he succeeded his father as Prince of Nassau-Usingen.  In 1783, he concluded a treaty of inheritance with the princes of Nassau-Saarbrücken, Nassau-Weilburg and Nassau-Dietz (i.e., Orange-Nassau), in which it was agreed that the Nassau lands were indivisible and that mutual succession among the various branches based on primogeniture would be observed.

In 1797, Prince Henry Louis of Nassau-Saarbrücken died childless and Charles William inherited his principality.  However, under the Treaty of Lunéville, the territories on the left bank of the Rhine were lost to France.  The Reichsdeputationshauptschluss of 1803 compensated Charles William with territories taken from the Electorate of Mainz, the Electorate of Cologne, Electorate of the Palatinate and Hesse.

Charles William died later that year.  Since he had no male heir, he was succeeded by his younger brother Frederick Augustus.

Marriage and issue 
Charles William married Countess Caroline Felizitas of Leiningen-Dagsburg, the daughter of Christian Karl Reinhard of Leiningen-Dagsburg-Falkenburg-Heidesheim.  Charles William and Carolina Felicitas had four children:
 Prince Karl Wilhelm (1761–1763)
 Caroline (1762–1823), who married Prince Frederick of Hesse-Kassel (1747–1837), the son of Landgrave Frederick II and Princess Mary of Great Britain and the founder of the cadet branch Hesse-Kassel-Rumpenheim.
 Princess Luise  (1763–1845)
 Prince NN of Nassau-Usingen (1768 – died in infancy)

Ancestry

References 
 Ernst Joachim: Karl Wilhelm von Nassau-Usingen. In: Allgemeine Deutsche Biographie (ADB). Band 15, Duncker & Humblot, Leipzig 1882, S. 315.

1735 births
1803 deaths
18th-century German people
Princes of Nassau